The 1987 Andorran local elections were held on 13 and 20 December. Voters elected the council members of the seven parishes of Andorra. Following the election, the communal councils elected the mayors and deputy mayors.

Electoral system
Candidates were elected using a two-round plurality-at-large voting system with open lists. As parties were not legalised until 1993, all the lists were officially labelled as independent, although media classified them as government endorsed (if the list was supported by the outgoing government) or opposition (if candidates were part of the opposition). After the elections, the parish councils elected the consol major (mayor) and the cònsol menor (deputy mayor), which normally were the top candidates of the winning list.

Candidates
Candidates by parish. The top candidates are listed for each list:
 Canillo
Government endorsed: Xavier Escribà, Miquel Naudi
Encamp
Government endorsed: Josep Maria Mas
Opposition: Miquel Alís, Josep Dalleres
Ordino
Government endorsed: Pere Babi, Albert Pujal
Opposition: Julià Vila, Enric Dolsa
La Massana
Government endorsed: unknown 
Opposition: unknown
Andorra la Vella
Government endorsed: Manuel Pons, Antoni Cerqueda
Opposition: Jaume Bartomeu, Joan Arajol
Sant Julià de Lòria
Government endorsed: Ricard Tor, Joan Santamaria
Opposition:  Joan Travesset, Maria Rosa Fàbrega
Escaldes-Engordany
Government endorsed: Josep Maria Beal
Opposition: Ignasi Maestre

Results
Turnout was 81.6%, 3.9 pp higher than in the previous election. In Andorra la Vella and Escaldes-Engordany, turnout was around 90%. In Canillo, it was around 60%.

In all parishes (but Encamp) the government endorsed lists won the election. A second round was held in Encamp, as only 9 out of 10 seats were filled in the first round. An opposition councillor was finally elected in the second round. Results by parish:

References

1987
1987 elections in Europe
1987 in Andorra